Lithuanian Film Studio is a Lithuanian film studio in Vilnius.

History 
In 1940 a studio was founded in Lithuania under Soviet rule, which from then on was responsible for the production of newsreels. This studio produced a first feature film in 1953, Aušra prie Nemuno, but still in co-production with Lenfilm. In 1956 it was renamed Lietuvos kino studija and from then on served as the headquarters for the state film industry. The studio produced its first independent feature film in 1957, directed by Vytautas Mikalauskas, with Zydrasis horizontas.

References

External links
Official site

Cinema of Lithuania
Film production companies of the Soviet Union
Mass media companies established in 1940
1940 establishments in Lithuania